Macrothelypteris is a genus of ferns in the family Thelypteridaceae, subfamily Phegopteridoideae, in the Pteridophyte Phylogeny Group classification of 2016 (PPG I). The genus name means 'large Thelypteris'.

Species
, the Checklist of Ferns and Lycophytes of the World and Plants of the World Online (POWO) listed the following species and one hybrid:
Macrothelypteris banaensis (Tardieu & C.Chr.) Christenh.
Macrothelypteris contingens Ching
Macrothelypteris multiseta (Baker) Ching
Macrothelypteris ogasawarensis (Nakai) Holttum
Macrothelypteris oligophlebia (Baker) Ching – treated as a synonym of Macrothelypteris torresiana in POWO
Macrothelypteris ornata (J.Sm.) Ching
Macrothelypteris polypodioides (Hook.) Holttum
Macrothelypteris rammelooi Pic.Serm.
Macrothelypteris setigera (Blume) Ching
Macrothelypteris × subviridifrons (Seriz.) Nakaike
Macrothelypteris sumatrana (Holttum) Pic.Serm.
Macrothelypteris torresiana (Gaudich.) Ching
Macrothelypteris viridifrons (Tagawa) Ching

References

Thelypteridaceae